Pollenia luteovillosa is a species of cluster fly in the family Polleniidae.

Distribution
Algeria, Morocco, Portugal, Spain.

References

Polleniidae
Insects described in 1987
Diptera of Europe
Diptera of Africa